Sir Herbert Brittain, KCB, KBE (3 July 1894 – 6 September1961) was a British civil servant. He was Second Secretary in HM Treasury from 1953 to 1957, in charge of home finance and supply expenditure.

References

External links 

 

1894 births
1961 deaths
Knights Commander of the Order of the Bath
Knights Commander of the Order of the British Empire
Alumni of the Victoria University of Manchester
Royal Field Artillery officers
British Army personnel of World War I
People from Lancashire
Civil servants in HM Treasury
20th-century British civil servants